Corner of Eden is the eighth studio album by Christian singer-songwriter Kathy Troccoli, released on October 13, 1998 on Reunion Records. The album won a Dove Award for Inspirational Album of the Year given to Troccoli and the album's producer Nathan DiGesare at the 30th GMA Dove Awards. Corner of Eden peaked at number 17 on the Top Christian Albums and number 26 on the Heatseekers Albums charts in Billboard magazine.

Track listing 
"A Different Road" (Kathy Troccoli, Bruce Sudano, Nathan DiGesare) - 6:30
"At Your Mercy" (Troccoli, DiGesare) - 4:35
"He Will Make a Way" (Troccoli, Sudano, DiGesare) - 6:09
"Psalm Twenty-Three" (Troccoli, DiGesare) - 4:49
"Goodbye for Now" (Troccoli, Scott Brasher) - 6:02
"We Will Know Love" (Troccoli, DiGesare, Mike McEvoy) - 4:40
"Fill Me Up" (Troccoli, DiGesare) - 5:01
"Corner of Eden" (Troccoli, Stephanie Lewis, Jeff Franzel) - 4:35
"When I Look at You" (Troccoli, DiGesare) - 4:23
"Take Me with You" (Troccoli, DiGesare) - 4:40

Personnel 
 Kathy Troccoli – vocals 
 Michael Omartian – keyboards (1, 3)
 Bernie Herms – synthesizers (1)
 Nathan DiGesare – keyboard programming (1, 2, 4, 6), acoustic piano (2, 4, 6, 9, 10), orchestrations (9)
 Steve Winwood – Hammond B3 organ (3)
 Tom Howard – orchestrations (1, 5), choir director (1), acoustic piano (5, 7, 8)
 Micah Wilshire – guitars (1, 9)
 David Cleveland – guitars (2, 7)
 Steve Cropper – guitars (3)
 Chris Rodriguez – guitars (4, 8, 10)
 Michael McEvoy – guitars (6), mandolin (6), viola (6)
 Jackie Street – bass (1, 2, 3, 7, 9)
 Gary Lunn – bass (4, 8)
 Scott Firth – bass (6)
 Scott Williamson – drums (1, 4, 7, 8, 9)
 Chester Thompson – drums (3)
 Walfredo Reyes Jr. – drums (6), percussion (6)
 Eric Darken – percussion (1, 3, 4, 7, 8, 9)
 Nashville String Machine – strings (1, 5, 9)
 Chris De Margary – tin whistle (6)
 Roger Ryan – choir director (3)
 Natalie Grant – backing vocals (1, 2, 3, 8)
 Tim Davis – backing vocals (1, 3, 8)
 Darwin Hobbs – backing vocals (1, 3)
 Nicol Smith – backing vocals (1, 3, 8)
 Valerie Chalmers – backing vocals (6)
 Emma Whittle – backing vocals (6)

Production
 Matt Baugher – executive producer 
 Bruce Koblish – executive producer 
 Nathan DiGesare – producer 
 Paul "Salvo" Salveson – recording, mixing 
 Alex Chan – assistant engineer
 Scott McCutcheon – assistant engineer
 Shawn McLean – assistant engineer 
 J.R. Rodriguez – assistant engineer
 Aaron Swihart – assistant engineer
 Ken Love – mastering at MasterMix (Nashville, Tennessee)
 Dave Fry – keyboard and technical assistant 
 Jim Rogers – keyboard and technical assistant 
 James Arledge – piano technician 
 Ric Domenico – music preparation 
 Mike Goode – music preparation 
 Matthew Barnes – photography 
 Diana Lussenden – art direction, design

Charts

Radio singles

Accolades 
GMA Dove Awards

References 

1998 albums
Kathy Troccoli albums
Reunion Records albums